Neoacotyledon is a genus of mites in the family Acaridae.

Species
 Neoacotyledon rhizoglyphoides (Zachvatkin, 1937)
 Neoacotyledon sokolovi (Zachvatkin, 1940)

References

Acaridae